Sarli may refer to:
Sarli dialect, a dialect of Gorani language in Iraq
Sarli-ye Olya, a village in Golestan Province, Iran
Sarli-ye Sofla, a village in Golestan Province, Iran
Isabel Sarli (1935-2019), Argentine actress
Carlos di Sarli (1903-1960), Argentine musician
Fausto Sarli (1927-2010), Italian fashion designer